The Makira boobook (Ninox roseoaxillaris), also known as the Makira owl, is a small to medium-sized species of owl in the Family Strigidae. It is endemic to Makira. It was formerly considered a subspecies of the Solomons boobook. The Makira boobook prefers habitats of Subtropical and Tropical Moist Lowland. It is possibly extant to Ugi Island and Owariki.

References

Makira owl
Endemic birds of the Solomon Islands
Owls of Oceania
Least concern biota of Oceania
Makira owl
Taxa named by Ernst Hartert